ShutItAllDown was a wave of anti-Sexual and Gender Based Violence protests across Namibia aimed at stopping the spread and continuation of physical and sexual violence against women. The protests, which began on 8 October 2020, followed the killing of 22 year old Shannon Wasserfall whose remains were reportedly found buried in a shallow grave near Walvis Bay, 6 months after she went missing.

Background
On 10 April 2020, 22 year old Shannon Wasserfall went missing in the coastal town of Walvis Bay. Following her disappearance, communities rallied together using social media in search of her. After 6 months of her disappearance, her father received an anonymous text message informing him that his daughter was buried in a grave kilometres away from the town. He later informed the Namibia Police who went to dig out the remains. Two days later, one woman and her boyfriend were arrested in connection to Wasserfall's murder.

Public reactions
Following the revelations of the discovery of a grave, massive protests from young Namibians rang out demanding an end to rape and the killing of women in the country. Young people used the hashtag #ShutItAllDown to mobilise themselves on social media platform Twitter and took to the streets to denounce sexual and gender based violence.

Protests and police brutality 
The events of Wasserfall's killing lead to nationwide protests. During the protests, the Namibia police began to counter the protesters arresting 25 youths including 3 journalists who were covering the events.

This followed an almost violent confrontation between protesters and the police alongside the Sam Nujoma Drive in the Windhoek City Centre. The arrested protesters took to social media to decry police treatment. They were later charged and released. On Monday 12 October, they appeared before the Windhoek Margistrates Court where several protesters joined them to continue the protests.

References

2020 in Namibia
Violence against women in Namibia
Women's rights in Namibia
2020 protests
October 2020 events in Africa
21st century in Windhoek